Raye Kass is a professor in the Department of Applied Human Sciences at Concordia University in Montreal.
She is the author of Theories of Small Group Development and the co-author of three other works on social group theory.  She has also been invited to be involved in space research projects.

Known for her contemporary, cutting edge, and timely research style and results, Dr. Kass has been highlighted frequently by both national and international press agencies for both her space sciences and group theory research. Kass was previously an advisor for Mars One, a now bankrupt organization which aimed to establish a human colony on Mars.

Education 
She attended Sir George Williams University in 1970, where she earned her Baccalaureate of Arts with Distinction. Afterwards she did her Master of Social Work at the University of Toronto, completing it in 1972. Later on, she gained her PhD in Educational Theory at University of Toronto by 1987.

Selected bibliography

Kass, R. (2002). Theories of small group development. Centre for Human Relations and Community Studies, Concordia University.

References

External links 
 Department of Applied Human Sciences

Year of birth missing (living people)
Living people
Academic staff of Concordia University
Space scientists
Women space scientists
21st-century Canadian women scientists
Mars One
Sir George Williams University alumni
Scientists from Quebec